Ginger pickle is a very popular pickle in Andhra Pradesh, India. This spicy pickles are also available commercially. Ginger is widely used in Asian and Indian cuisine. The pickles are prepared by peeling and crushing ginger and mixing with the tamarind pulp and seasoning with mustard seeds.

References

Pickles
Indian pickles